Nikolai Tiopliy (born May 21, 1957 in Kemerovo Oblast) is a Russian sport shooter. He competed at the 1996 and 2000 Summer Olympics. In 1996, he placed fifth in the men's skeet event, while in 2000, he tied for 23rd place in the men's skeet event.

References

1957 births
Living people
Skeet shooters
Russian male sport shooters
Shooters at the 1996 Summer Olympics
Shooters at the 2000 Summer Olympics
Olympic shooters of Russia
Universiade silver medalists for Russia
Universiade medalists in shooting
Sportspeople from Kemerovo Oblast